Samuel Bowles may refer to:

Samuel Bowles (journalist) (1826–1878), American journalist
Samuel Bowles (economist) (born 1939), American economist